The Bank of Central and South America was established in Connecticut in 1922.  The next year it acquired some of the assets of the Mercantile Bank of the Americas (est. 1915), including its entire interest in the National Bank of Nicaragua, Banco Mercantil de Costa Rica, Banco Mercantil Americano del Peru, Banco Mercantil Americano de Caracas and Banco Mercantil Americano de Colombia.  It had a branch in Hamburg, and 22 branches in Latin America, including four in Venezuela, six in Peru, eight in Colombia, four in Nicaragua, and one in Costa Rica.

The shareholders of the bank included the firms of J.P. Morgan & Company, the Guaranty Trust Company, Brown Brothers and Company, J. and W. Seligman and Company, the Corn Exchange Bank, the Mechanics and Metals National Bank, W.R. Grace and Company, and other interests.  Despite its connections and experienced officers, the bank was not successful and in 1925 the Royal Bank of Canada purchased the South American operations.

References

Clyde William Phelps. 1927. The foreign expansion of American banks : American branch banking abroad. (New York: Arno Press, 1976).

Banks based in Connecticut
Banks established in 1822
Banks of Central America
Banks of South America